Hulste is a village in the Belgian province of West Flanders. Hulste has 3456 inhabitants (2008) and an area of 7.86 km2. It fused in 1977 to become part of the city of Harelbeke.

References 

Populated places in West Flanders
Harelbeke